Dronke is a surname. Notable people with the name include:

Ernst Friedrich Johann Dronke (1797–1849), German philologist and educator
Ernst Dronke (1822–1891), German socialist and journalist, son of Ernst Friedrich Johann Dronke
Maria Dronke (1904–1987), New Zealand actor, drama producer and teacher; sister of psychiatrist Arthur Kronfeld
Peter Dronke (1934–2020), German academic, son of Maria, husband of Ursula
Ursula Dronke (1920–2012), British medievalist, wife of Peter